The Italian ambassador in Buenos Aires is the official representative of the Government in Rome to the Government of Argentina.

List of representatives 
<onlyinclude>

References 

 
Argentina
Italy